General Rea may refer to:

Joaquín Rea (died 1850), Mexican general in the Mexican–American War
John Rea (politician) (1755–1829), Pennsylvania Militia major general in the War of 1812
Leonard E. Rea (1897–1972), U.S. Marine Corps major general

See also
General Rey (disambiguation)